Stenotrophomonas pictorum is a bacterium from the genus of Stenotrophomonas which has been isolated from soil.

References

External links
Type strain of Stenotrophomonas pictorum at BacDive -  the Bacterial Diversity Metadatabase

Xanthomonadales
Bacteria described in 1928